Panacris is a genus of flies in the family Stratiomyidae.

Species
Panacris funebris James, 1980
Panacris lucida Gerstaecker, 1857
Panacris maxima Kertész, 1908
Panacris microdonta Kertész, 1908
Panacris nigribasis Lindner, 1949
Panacris pictipennis Kertész, 1908
Panacris protrudens James, 1980
Panacris tarsalis (Gerstaecker, 1857)

References

Stratiomyidae
Brachycera genera
Taxa named by Carl Eduard Adolph Gerstaecker
Diptera of North America
Diptera of South America